Miami–Erie Canal Site Historic District is a registered historic district on the Miami and Erie Canal near West Chester, Ohio. The district consists of Lock #38 on the canal, the house used by the lock's gatekeeper, and several foundation sites from demolished canal-related buildings. The limestone lock was built in 1825-26 as part of the original construction of the canal, which connected the Ohio River to Lake Erie. The gatekeeper's house, the second built at the lock, was constructed in 1870; the first house's foundation is still present as well. A mill race connects the lock to the former Friend and Fox Paper Company, which opened a paper mill on the canal in 1866. The paper mill was destroyed by a fire in 1932, though its foundations and retaining walls are still part of the site.

The district was added to the National Register of Historic Places on December 18, 1978.

Notes 

Canals on the National Register of Historic Places in Ohio
Historic districts on the National Register of Historic Places in Ohio
Historic districts in Butler County, Ohio
National Register of Historic Places in Butler County, Ohio